Albert Hughes Craig (born 3 January 1962) is a Scottish former footballer, who played as a midfielder.

Career
Craig began his career with Dumbarton in 1981 and made over 150 appearances for the Sons over a five-year period. A move to Hamilton Academical in 1986 was quickly followed by a further transfer to Newcastle United for £95,000 just six months later after impressing in the Accies win away at Rangers in the 1986–87 Scottish Cup; however he played just ten times for the Magpies. Loan spells back at Hamilton and also with Northampton Town  preceded a move back to Scotland with Dundee in 1989.

Craig spent three years at Dens Park before moving to Partick Thistle in August 1992, where he went on to make over 100 league appearances. In 1996, Craig moved to Falkirk before year-long spells with Stenhousemuir and a return to Partick Thistle to finish his career.

Personal life
Off the pitch, Craig received a twelve-month prison sentence in July 2005 after admitting stealing over £40,000 from the Royal Mail in a postal fraud.

Honours

DundeeScottish First Division: 1 1991–92

FalkirkScottish Challenge Cup: 1'
 1996–97

References

External links
 
 

1962 births
Footballers from Glasgow
Living people
Dumbarton F.C. players
Hamilton Academical F.C. players
Newcastle United F.C. players
Northampton Town F.C. players
Dundee F.C. players
Partick Thistle F.C. players
Falkirk F.C. players
Stenhousemuir F.C. players
English Football League players
Scottish Football League players
Scottish footballers
Association football midfielders
People convicted of fraud
Scottish prisoners and detainees
Sportspeople convicted of crimes